Emmeline 'Nina' Cust (1867–1955) was an English writer, editor, translator and sculptor. She was a member of The Souls, an upper class circle that challenged the conventions and attitudes of their class in the late nineteenth and early twentieth centuries.

Personal life 
Cust was born at Denton Hall to Victoria, Lady Welby, a philosophical writer and Sir William Earle Welby-Gregory, a politician and landowner. Her maternal grandmother, Lady Emmeline Stuart-Wortley was a renowned Victorian poet and travel writer.

In 1893, Cust married another member of The Souls, Henry John Cockayne-Cust. She supported her husband in much of his work, including correspondence for the Central Committee for National Patriotic Organisations. Cust was devoted to her husband, despite a reputedly unhappy marriage that lasted until his death in 1917.

Cust was a direct neighbour of sculptor Jacob Epstein when they both lived at Hyde Park Gate in London.

Writing and translation 
Cust wrote a biography of her mother, Victoria, Lady Welby's first thirty years, entitled 'Wanderers: episodes from the travels of Lady Emmeline Stuart-Wortley and her daughter Victoria, 1849-1855'. She also published accounts of her grandmother's travels. Cust contributed shorter pieces to contemporary periodicals including the journal of the English Association.

Virginia Woolf is known to have reviewed at least one of Cust's published books, probably 'Gentleman Errant'.

Cust's translation of 'Semantics; studies in the science of meaning' by Michel Jules Alfred Bréal presented the text's first appearance in English.

Other published works include 

 Gentlemen Errant: being the journeys and adventures of four noblemen in Europe during the fifteenth and sixteenth centuries, first published by John Murray, London, in 1909
 Not all the suns; poems, 1917-1944, first published by Nicholson & Watson, London, in 1944
 A Tub of Gold Fishes, first published by James Bain, London
 Dilectissimo, first published by Macmillan and Co., London, in 1932

Artwork 
Cust may have attended the Académie Julian in Paris, although it is unclear which art forms she trained in. It is also possible that she studied sculpture in London.

Cust exhibited her sculpture at the Royal Academy in 1906 showing a bust of her niece and in 1927, part of a model of her husband. She exhibited both in the United Kingdom and abroad, with works shown in Manchester, Liverpool, Birmingham and Paris.

In 1884, Cust was the subject of a portrait bust by Alfred Gilbert. Alexander Fisher produced an enamelled portrait of Cust in 1898.

Works held in collections 
Cust's sculpture is represented in British collections including the following works,

References

External links 
 

1867 births
1955 deaths
19th-century English women artists
20th-century English women artists
19th-century English women writers
19th-century English writers
20th-century English women writers
English sculptors
English women sculptors
People from Lincolnshire